In mathematics, the approximate limit is a generalization of the ordinary limit for real-valued functions of several real variables.

A function f on  has an approximate limit y at a point x if there exists a set F that has density 1 at the point such that if xn is a sequence in F that converges towards x then f(xn) converges towards y.

Properties

The approximate limit of a function, if it exists, is unique. If f has an ordinary limit at x then it also has an approximate limit with the same value.

We denote the approximate limit of f at x0 by

Many of the properties of the ordinary limit are also true for the approximate limit.

In particular, if a is a scalar and f and g are functions, the following equations are true if values on the right-hand side are well-defined (that is the approximate limits exist and in the last equation the approximate limit of g is non-zero.)

Approximate continuity and differentiability

If

then f is said to be approximately continuous at x0. If f is function of only one real variable and the difference quotient

has an approximate limit as h approaches zero we say that f has an approximate derivative at x0. It turns out that approximate differentiability implies approximate continuity, in perfect analogy with ordinary continuity and differentiability.

It also turns out that the usual rules for the derivative of a sum, difference, product and quotient have straightforward generalizations to the approximate derivative. There is no generalization of the chain rule that is true in general however.

External links
 Approximate continuity at Encyclopedia of Mathematics
 Approximate derivative at Encyclopedia of Mathematics
 Approximate differentiability at Encyclopedia of Mathematics

References

Real analysis
Limits (mathematics)